Mercedes-Benz Fashion Week is a series of international fashion weeks sponsored by Mercedes-Benz, a brand of Daimler AG. Designers featured during Mercedes-Benz Fashion Weeks include notable designers such as Rosenthal Tee, Mary Katrantzou and David Koma.

Notable Mercedes-Benz Fashion Weeks include events in Madrid, Berlin, Georgia, Miami, Russia, Istanbul, and Mexico,

Mercedes-Benz Fashion 

Mercedes-Benz Fashion is a "fashion engagement programme" based in Stuttgart, Germany, a supplementary initiative of German automotive manufacturer Mercedes-Benz. 

The automotive provider partners with select fashion weeks and events internationally, devises programmes to support fashion creatives and provide sponsorship.

Fashion Partnerships 
The brand is currently active at approximately 80 fashion events in nearly 40 countries, including the Mercedes-Benz Fashion Weeks in Mexico City, Madrid, Tbilisi, Russia and Berlin, and also the famous International Festival of Fashion, Photography and Fashion Accessories in Hyères.

References

Fashion events
Fashion Week